A stymie is an obsolete rule in the sport of golf. It legislated for the situation where a player's ball lay behind or blocked by another player's ball; the blocked player was not afforded relief. In the modern game, the blocking ball is temporarily removed to afford a clear line to the hole.

Various changes to the stymie rule were enacted in 1938 and 1941.  Finally, in 1952, the stymie rule was removed from the rules of golf when the USGA and the R&A established a joint set of rules.

Rule history
 In singles match play when one player's ball blocked the path of another player's ball on the green, but the two were not within six inches of each other, the obstructing ball was not lifted. This forced the player who was further away from the hole to either attempt to chip his ball over the obstructing ball or to putt around it. If his ball struck the opponent's ball, his next shot would have to be played from where his ball came to rest and his opponent, when it was his turn to play, had the choice to attempt his putt from his ball's original position or its new one. If the player's ball knocked the obstructing ball into the cup, his opponent was considered to have holed out on the previous shot.

Rule modifications
In 1920, the United States Golf Association tested a modified stymie rule for one year, allowing a stymied player to concede the opponent's next putt. The next change to the stymie rule came in 1938, when the USGA began a two-year trial in which an obstructing ball within  of the hole could be moved regardless of the distance between the balls. The USGA made this rule permanent in 1941. However, during this time, the Royal and Ancient Golf Club of St Andrews never modified their stymie rule.

Rule abolished
The stymie rule was abolished in 1952, when the first jointly published set of rules established by the USGA and the R&A came into effect.

References

Rules of golf